Pingaring is a small town in the Wheatbelt region of Western Australia.

The name of the town is the Indigenous Australian name of a nearby spring that was first recorded by surveyors in 1926.
The town originated as a railway siding on the Hyden to Lake Grace line, with its location being decided in 1930. The townsite was gazetted in 1963.

The surrounding areas produce wheat and other cereal crops. The town is a receival site for Cooperative Bulk Handling.

References 

Grain receival points of Western Australia
Shire of Lake Grace